Alex Foster is a Costa Rican Olympic hurdler. He represented his country in the men's 400 metres hurdles at the 1992 Summer Olympics. His time was a 52.93 in the hurdles. He is the brother of fellow Olympian Randolph Foster.

References

1970 births
Living people
Costa Rican male hurdlers
Olympic athletes of Costa Rica
Athletes (track and field) at the 1992 Summer Olympics
World Athletics Championships athletes for Costa Rica
Central American Games silver medalists for Costa Rica
Central American Games medalists in athletics
20th-century Costa Rican people